Edward A. Mueller is the former Chief Executive Officer and Chairman of Qwest Communications.

Career
Mueller attended the University of Missouri - Rolla for a bachelor's degree in civil engineering and Washington University in St. Louis for a Master of Business Administration. In 2000, he became president and chief executive officer (CEO) of Ameritech Corporation, serving until 2002. In January 2003, he became CEO of Williams-Sonoma, Inc., a position he held until July 2006. On August 10, 2007, he became chief executive officer and chairman of Qwest Communications. In 2015 Mueller joined the McKesson board as an independent board member. In November 2018, with the announcement of the retirement of John Hammergren, McKesson CEO and chairman of the board, Mueller was announced to become the new chairman of the board effective April, 1, 2019.

Compensation
While CEO of Qwest Communications in 2008, Mueller earned a total compensation of $11,319,226, which included a base salary of $1,200,000, a cash bonus of $2,250,000, stocks granted of $4,202,943, and options granted of $2,675,781.

References

External links
Qwest Communications website

Living people
Year of birth missing (living people)
Missouri University of Science and Technology alumni
Olin Business School (Washington University) alumni
American chief executives
American telecommunications industry businesspeople
Missing middle or first names